The Middle Course is a low budget 1961 British war film.

Plot
During World War II, a Canadian pilot crash lands in a small French village occupied by German forces. The villagers find a useful ally in the young flyer, but the Germans become anxious to eliminate the force behind the strengthened local resistance.

Cast
Vincent Ball - Cliff
Lisa Daniely - Anna
Peter Illing - Gromik
Roland Bartrop - Paul
Marne Maitland - Renard
Robert Rietti - Jacques
André Maranne - Franz 
André Mikhelson - Commandant
Jan Conrad - Herman
John Serret - Leverne
William Abney - Jaghorst
Yvonne André - Martine
Julian Sherrier - Villager 
Donald Tandy - Sgt. Wilhelm
Jacques Cey - Pierre

Critical reception
TV Guide called the film "a predictable type of war drama that went out of fashion in the US ten years before this was made, but probably will always be resurrected in a nation that suffered so much at the time."

References

External links

The Middle Course at TCMDB

1961 films
Films directed by Montgomery Tully
British drama films
Films shot at New Elstree Studios
1960s English-language films
1960s British films